Barbara Winslow is an American historian.

Life 

She was born and raised in New York City.

Education 

Winslow attended Antioch College where she majored in Women Studies. She spent her junior year abroad at the University of Leeds, and subsequently returned to the UK in 1969 to attend the University of Warwick, where she studied under E. P. Thompson, who she has described as "the most important academic influence on my life". She obtained her Ph.D in Women's History from the University of Washington.

Career 

She is currently an Associate Professor in the School of Education at Brooklyn College and CUNY.

Distinctions 

She is a member of the Organization of American Historians.

Bibliography 

Some of her books are:

 Shirley Chisholm: Catalyst for Change 
 Dance on a Sealskin 
 Kittery Ghost 
 Sylvia Pankhurst: Sexual Politics and Political Activism
 Fancy and Francis 
 Samantha Goes to Georgetown on the C & O Canal

References

External links
 

Year of birth missing (living people)
Living people
21st-century American historians
Antioch College alumni
University of Washington alumni
Brooklyn College faculty